A partial solar eclipse will occur on Monday, November 14, 2050. A solar eclipse occurs when the Moon passes between Earth and the Sun, thereby totally or partly obscuring the image of the Sun for a viewer on Earth. A partial solar eclipse occurs in the polar regions of the Earth when the center of the Moon's shadow misses the Earth.

Related eclipses

Solar eclipses  2047–2050

Metonic series

References

External links
 http://eclipse.gsfc.nasa.gov/SEplot/SEplot2001/SE2050Nov14P.GIF

2050 11 14
2050 in science
2050 11 14
2050 11 14